This is a list of weapons of West Germany. West Germany was formed as a result of the division of germany after World War II. As part of the Western Bloc West Germany was a member of NATO and an important part of the alliance. Especially so since any conflict with the Soviet Union was most likely going to start in West Germany itself or on its border with East Germany. After West Germany was reunited with East Germany during German reunification in 1990 they still retained NATO membership and today as a united Germany  have remained a crucial part of the alliance.

Small arms

Rifles 
 FN FAL-Adopted in 1956 just after Germany was allowed to rearm in 1955 designated G1.only lasted 3 years was replaced by G3 in 1959. 
 Heckler & Koch G3-Main German Cold War rifle.

Sidearms 
 Walther P38-reintroduced from WWII in 1957 and saw service till 1963.After this a new variant of the pistol the P1 was introduced and served as the standard German sidearm for the rest of the Cold War.

Machine guns 
 MG 3 machine gun- Modernised variant of WWII MG 42. Served as main German Cold War machine gun from late 1950s.

Anti tank weapons 
 PzF 44
 MILAN

Artillery

Towed 
 FH70

Self propelled 
 M107 self-propelled gun
 M109 howitzer
 M110 howitzer

Self propelled rocket artillery 
 Light Artillery Rocket System-Created in Germany.

Anti-aircraft

Self propelled 
 Flakpanzer Gepard

Armoured fighting vehicles AFV's

Main battle tanks 
 M47 Patton
 M48 Patton
 Leopard 1
 Leopard 2

Light tanks 
 M41 Walker Bulldog

Tank destroyers 
 Kanonenjagdpanzer
 Raketenjagdpanzer 1
 Raketenjagdpanzer 2

Infantry fighting vehicles(IFV's) 
 Schützenpanzer SPz 11-2 Kurz
 Schützenpanzer Lang HS.30
 Marder (IFV)

References

West Germany
Military weapons